Athens Academy is a private, co-educational, college preparatory school in Athens, Georgia. As of 2017, the school enrollment is approximately 945 students. It has been described as a segregation academy.

History 
Athens Academy was founded on September 6, 1967 in Athens, Georgia. At the time, the school's students were all white, and the school has been described as a segregation academy and as a white-flight academy. According to the school's website, however, the vision of Athens Academy's founders, as articulated in their original charter, was to establish a school for students from "diverse social, economic, religious, and racial backgrounds who can benefit from a rigorous academic program led by a highly qualified and enthusiastic faculty." Athens Academy opened as a private college-preparatory school on a property that formerly belonged to Harvey W. Cabaniss Sr. It consisted of a Colonial Revival home and a red barn located on Prince and Hawthorne Avenues. The school then moved to a property donated by J. Swanton Ivy.

Athens Academy was headed by Ronald Griffeth and D. Alvin Cash before J. Robert Chambers became headmaster in 1983, followed by John Thorsen in 2014. The school celebrated its 50th anniversary in September 2017.

Academics and administration
The Athens Academy curriculum provides general college-preparatory and honors programs. The College Board's Advanced Placement program is offered as an outgrowth of the Academy's honors program. Art, music, physical education, and drama classes are offered in addition to traditional academic disciplines. The school also offers several studio art classes along with digital art and animation, drawing and painting courses. As of 2008, 21% of graduating seniors were National Merit Scholarship winners.

Athens Academy is made up of four divisions: Preschool, Lower School, Middle School, and Upper School. It is led by a headmaster who reports to the Athens Academy Board of Trustees. Until his retirement following the 2012–2013 school year, Chambers served as headmaster of the school for more than 30 years. He was succeeded by John Thorsen who became Athens Academy's fifth headmaster on July 1, 2014. Beth Sanders is chair of the board of trustees; Susan Zalac is director of the Upper School; Jeff Stachura serves as director of the Middle School; Mark Cunningham is the director of the Lower School; Colleen Burwell is the director of the Preschool.

Campus 
The Athens Academy campus is located in Athens, Georgia. J. Swanton Ivy originally donated to the school  of land just inside Oconee County. As the school continued to grow, it expanded to the surrounding area.

The campus has 24 buildings over  located off U.S. Route 441. The Chambers Center, a new administration building named after the former headmaster, was the latest building to be inaugurated in September 2017.

Athletics 
Athens Academy competes in region 8-A of the Georgia High School Association (GHSA). They field teams in cross country, football, competitive swimming and diving, golf, track and field, basketball, volleyball, soccer, tennis, cheerleading, wrestling, and baseball. The team name is the Spartans. In grades 7–12, 78% of students participate in athletics.

Notable alumni 
 Amy Bruckner, actress
Houston Gaines, Georgia State Representative (2019–present)
Vicki Goetze-Ackerman, LPGA Tour golfer
 Elizabeth Guess, soccer player
 Brian Kemp attended through fifth grade
 Lauren Schacher, actress
 Keith Wiggans, soccer player
Joe Tereshinski III, American football quarterback and college football coach

References

Private high schools in Georgia (U.S. state)
Private middle schools in Georgia (U.S. state)
Private elementary schools in Georgia (U.S. state)
Schools in Oconee County, Georgia
Preparatory schools in Georgia (U.S. state)
Segregation academies in Georgia
1967 establishments in Georgia (U.S. state)